Mattie Thomas Blount High School is one of 16 high schools in the Mobile County Public School System. It is located in Eight Mile and in unincorporated Mobile County, Alabama.

It serves portions of Prichard. It is named for administrator Mattie Thomas Blount. As of 2022, 96 percent of the student body is African American. It had about 1,160 students. The school colors are purple and white and leopards are the mascot. It has won several championship in football and several players have gone on to the NFL.

Feeder patterns
The following middle schools feed into Blount High School :

Portions of the attendance zone:
 Chastang Middle School
 Scarborough Middle School
 Semmes Middle School

Athletics
Blount's athletic teams plays in the Alabama High School Athletic Association Class 6A Region One. The nickname for the athletic teams is the "Leopards".

In 2022, members of the football team were getting baptized together and the team was receiving visits from a local pastor.

Notable alumni
 Derrick Burroughs, former NFL player
 Larry Cowan, former NFL player
 Dameyune Craig, former Auburn quarterback and NFL player, current Texas A&M wide receivers' coach
 James Evans, former NFL player
 Alonzo Johnson, former NFL player
 Charlie Parker, former NFL and CFL player
 Karl Powe, former NFL player
 Sims Stokes, former NFL player
 Kadarius Toney, NFL player for the Kansas City Chiefs and Rapper
 Sherman Williams, former NFL player
 Kennedy Winston, professional basketball player

References

External links

 Blount High School website
 Blount High School Alumni Association

Public high schools in Alabama
Schools in Mobile County, Alabama